George James Meldon (18 January 1885 – 27 November 1951) was an Irish cricketer. He was a right-handed batsman.

He made his debut for Ireland against Cambridge University in July 1904, and went on to play for them twelve times, his last game coming in August 1912 against Scotland. Nine of his Ireland games had first-class status, and he also played one first-class match for Woodbrook Club and Ground against South Africa in 1912.

References
 CricketEurope Stats Zone profile

1885 births
1951 deaths
Cricketers from Dublin (city)
Irish cricketers
Woodbrook Club and Ground cricketers